Pyralis lienigialis, the northern meal moth, is a species of snout moth. It is found in France, Portugal, Spain, Italy, Great Britain, Fennoscandia, Estonia, Latvia, Russia, Ukraine, Moldavia and Romania.

The wingspan is 22–26 mm. Adults are on wing from June to September.

The larvae are thought to feed on stored cereals such as barley and hay.

References

Moths described in 1843
Pyralini
Moths of Europe